John William Garrett, Jr. (born c. 1961) in Huntington, West Virginia, was a Chief Warrant Officer in the United States Army. He was deployed to Germany where he was on board the Army's UH-60 Black Hawk helicopters. He was participating in Operation Provide Comfort when his helicopter was shot down.

John Jr. grew up in the Huntington area, where he attended St. Joseph High School. His high school teachers recalled that he seemed interested in the military early on. Some of his heroes were the Wright Brothers, Chuck Yeager, and John Glenn. His love for flight history and travel made the Air Force a natural fit for him.

John Garrett Jr. was married and had a daughter. The family later moved to Wurzburg, Germany, where they were stationed at the time of his tragic accident. ("State Native's Love of Flying Recalled," Charleston Daily Mail, 15 April 1994.)

The 1994 Black Hawk shootdown incident, sometimes referred to as the Black Hawk Incident, was a friendly fire incident over northern Iraq that occurred on 14 April 1994 during Operation Provide Comfort (OPC). Colonel Jerry Thompson was changing command (or co-command as “command” of Provide Comfort was shared with Turkey). Colonel Thompson assembled 26 people that comprised important (command group) roles for the mission. He included French, British, and Turkish commanders and laisons, and brought along Kurdish para-military personnel and linguists. The pilots of two United States Air Force (USAF) F-15 fighter aircraft, operating under the control of a USAF airborne warning and control system (AWACS) aircraft, misidentified two United States Army UH-60 Black Hawk helicopters as Iraqi Mil Mi-24 "Hind" helicopters. The F-15 pilots fired on and destroyed both helicopters, killing all 26 military and civilians aboard, including personnel from the United States, United Kingdom, France, Turkey, and the Kurdish community.

Through a collaborative effort of artists, victims, and donors, The Eagle Flight Detachment Memorial Monument, a monument to the 26 victims of the shootdown was constructed at Giebelstadt Army Airfield, Germany and dedicated on 14 April 1996. After U.S. military presence ceased at Giebelstadt, due to base closures, the monument was moved to Fort Rucker, Alabama on 10 March 2006, and rededicated on 14 April 2007.

References 

United States Army officers
1960s births
1994 deaths
Year of birth uncertain
Military personnel from Huntington, West Virginia